Doroshkevich is a gender-neutral Slavic surname. It may refer to
Andrei Doroshkevich (born 1937), Russian theoretical astrophysicist and cosmologist
Yury Doroshkevich (born 1978), Belarusian football coach and former player

Russian-language surnames